Syngnathus macrobrachium (large-fin pipefish) is a species of pipefishes, which is common in the southern-eastern Pacific in the coastal waters from Tumbes (Peru) to Puerto Montt (Chile). It is a marine subtropical demersal fish, up to  length.  Very little is known about this species' biology but it is thought that it lives over sand and other soft sea beds in shallow coastal waters including estuaries and brackish lagoons. This species is ovoviviparous, the males brood the fertilised eggs below the tail before giving birth to the larvae.

References

macrobrachium
Fish of the Pacific Ocean
Fish of South America
Fish of Chile
Fish of Peru
Fish described in 1980